The 2007–2008 Women's CEV Champions League was an international volleyball club competition for elite clubs throughout Europe.

Teams of the 2007–2008
Participants:

Format

Regular season

20 teams take part in this phase. The teams are put in 5 group of 4 teams each.
The first two teams and the best third will play the Play-off 12 teams.
If the organizer of the final four is qualified, another best third will advance.

Play-off 12 teams

A draw will fix the opponents of the matches.
A knock-out stage determine the 6 teams that will advance to the Play-off 6 teams.

Play-off 6 teams

Another knock-out stage determine the other 3 teams that will play the final four.

Final four

The culminating stage of the Champions league in which the four remaining teams play a semifinal match and the winners of those advance to the final. The losers play in a third-place playoff. The team which is victorious in the final will be Champions league champion.

Group stage

Pool A

Pool B

Pool C

Pool D

Pool E

Play-off 12
first leg: 12/13/14 February 2008
second leg: 19/20/21 February 2008

First leg

Second leg

Play-off 6
first leg: 4/5/6 March 2008
second leg: 11/12/13 March 2008

First leg

Second leg

Final four
Palacio de Deportes de Murcia, Murcia, 5 & 6 April 2008

Semi-finals

Match 3/4

Match 1/2

Final standing

Individual awards Final Four
Winners:
 MVP:  Simona Gioli, Colussi Perugia
Best Scorer:  Katarzyna Skowrońska,  Asystel Novara
Best Spiker:   Mirka Francia,  Colussi Perugia
Best Receiver:   Nataša Osmokrović,  Asystel Novara
Best Server:   Zhanna Pronicheva,    Zarechie Odintsovo
Best Blocker:   Marisa Fernandez,   Grupo 2002 Murcia
Best Setter:  Hélia Souza,  Grupo 2002 Murcia
Best Libero:   Paola Cardullo,    Asystel Novara

References

External links
 Official site

CEV Women's Champions League
CEV Women's Champions League
CEV Women's Champions League